Krasnoarmeysky District (Krasnoarmeyski rayonĕ) is an administrative and municipal district (raion), one of the twenty-one in the Chuvash Republic, Russia. It is located in the north of the republic and borders with Cheboksarsky District in the north, Tsivilsky District in the northeast, Kanashsky and Vurnarsky Districts in the south, and with Alikovsky and Morgaushsky Districts in the west. Its administrative center is the rural locality (a selo) of Krasnoarmeyskoye. Population:  The population of Krasnoarmeyskoye accounts for 26.6% of the district's total population.

History
The district was established on January 9, 1935.

References

Notes

Sources

Districts of Chuvashia

